The Deposition or Lamentation over the Dead Christ was a painting by the Flemish painter Anthony van Dyck, produced between 1629 and 1630. It measured 220 cm by 166 cm. Its final owners were the Kaiser Friedrich Museum then the Gemäldegalerie, Berlin, before it was lost (either missing or destroyed) in May 1945 in the Friedrichshain flak tower fire. A copy of the work is now in the Gedächtniskapelle  of the Deutschordensmünster in Heilbronn.

References

Christopher Norris, 'The Disaster at Flakturm Friedrichshain; A Chronicle and List of Paintings', Burlington Magazine, Vol. 94, No. 597 (Dec., 1952), pp. 337–347

1630 paintings
Religious paintings by Anthony van Dyck
Paintings of the Descent from the Cross
Paintings depicting Mary Magdalene
Paintings of the Virgin Mary
Paintings of the Lamentation of Christ